
Gmina Cieszków is a rural gmina (administrative district) in Milicz County, Lower Silesian Voivodeship, in south-western Poland.

Neighbouring gminas
Gmina Cieszków is bordered by the gminas of Jutrosin, Milicz and Zduny.

Villages
The gmina contains the villages of Biadaszka, Brzezina, Cieszków, Dziadkowo, Góry, Grzebielin, Guzowice, Jankowa, Jawor, Nowy Folwark, Pakosławsko, Pustków, Rakłowice, Sędraszyce, Słabocin, Trzebicko, Trzebicko Dolne, Trzebicko-Piaski, Ujazd, Wężowice, Zwierzyniec and Zymanów.

References

Cieszkow
Milicz County